Merlyn Ray Pohlman (July 22, 1930 – November 1, 1990) was an American session musician and arranger who played both upright bass and bass guitar, and also did sessions as a guitarist.  He is credited with being the first electric bass player in Los Angeles studios in the 1950s.

Biography
Pohlman was a first-call member of The Wrecking Crew, who recorded with Phil Spector and The Beach Boys.  He was the musical director of the house band, "The Shindogs", on the 1960s television show Shindig!

His bass guitar playing is credited on hundreds of tracks including The Beach Boys' Good Vibrations.
Pohlman died of heart failure at the age of 60.

Artists with whom Pohlman recorded
Per AllMusic.

 Richie Allen
 Ann-Margret
 The Association
 Chet Baker
 The Beach Boys
 Pat Boone
 Tim Buckley
 Glen Campbell
 Leonard Cohen
 Sam Cooke
 Doris Day
 Dion
 Duane Eddy
 The Everly Brothers
 The 5th Dimension
 The Four Preps
 Merle Haggard
 Emmylou Harris
 Lee Hazlewood
 The Hondells
 Jan & Dean
 Gary Lewis & the Playboys
 Donna Loren
 The Marketts
 Bette Midler
 The Monkees
 Mystic Moods Orchestra
 Ricky Nelson
 Willie Nelson
 Laura Nyro
 Fess Parker
 Paul Revere & the Raiders
 The Rip Chords
 The Ronettes
 Del Shannon
 T.G. Sheppard
 Mel Tormé
 The Turtles
 Ian Whitcomb

Discography

As sideman
With The Beach Boys
 Fun Fun Fun
 Help Me, Ronda
 Dance Dance Dance
 I Know There's An Answer
 I Just Wasn't Made For These Times
 Here Today
 Please Let Me Wonder
 God Only Knows

With Sam Cooke
 Bring It On Home To Me
 Good Times
 Having a Party

With The Ronettes
 Be My Baby
 Baby, I Love You

References

External links
 
 

1930 births
1990 deaths
20th-century American bass guitarists
20th-century double-bassists
20th-century American male musicians
American double-bassists
American male bass guitarists
American rock bass guitarists
American session musicians
Male double-bassists
The Wrecking Crew (music) members